The plain gerygone (Gerygone inornata) is a species of bird in the family Acanthizidae.  It is found on the islands of Wetar and Timor.  Its natural habitats are subtropical or tropical moist lowland forest and subtropical or tropical mangrove forest.

References

External links

Gerygone inornata on Bird Life International
Gerygone inornata on Encyclopedia of Life
Gerygone inornata on Global Biodiversity Information Facility
Gerygone inornata on Biolib
Gerygone inornata on ITIS

plain gerygone
Birds of Timor
Birds of Wetar
plain gerygone
Taxonomy articles created by Polbot